Beat Motzer (born 2 September 1970) is a Swiss wrestler. He competed in the men's Greco-Roman 63 kg at the 2000 Summer Olympics.

References

1970 births
Living people
Swiss male sport wrestlers
Olympic wrestlers of Switzerland
Wrestlers at the 2000 Summer Olympics
Place of birth missing (living people)